"26 Monkeys, Also the Abyss" is a fantasy short story  by American writer Kij Johnson, published in 2008 on the American magazine Asimov's Science Fiction.  It was nominated for the 2009 Nebula Award for Best Short Story and the 2009 Hugo Award for Best Short Story. It won the 2009 World Fantasy Award for Best Short Fiction and the Asimov's readers' award for best short story.

Plot summary
Aimee has bought a travelling monkey show, wherein 26 monkeys do a variety of tricks and then vanish. She tries to figure out how the vanishing happens.

References

External links 
 
Text of the story at KijJohnson.com

Fantasy short stories
2008 short stories
Works originally published in Asimov's Science Fiction
Short stories by Kij Johnson
World Fantasy Award-winning works